Mary Maxwell may refer to:

Mary Maxwell (Bahá'í), Rúhíyyih Khanum, Baha'i Hand of the Cause of God, and wife of Shoghi Effendi
 Mary Maxwell, wife of Charles Stuart, 4th Earl of Traquair
Mary Maxwell (businesswoman) and mother of Bill Gates
Mary Beth Maxwell, founding executive director of American Rights at Work 
Mary Maxwell (writer), née Mary Elizabeth Braddon